is a Japanese manga author.

He is one of the authors of Even a Monkey Can Draw Manga. He is also the story writer of Super Mario Adventures.

References

External links
 Takekuma Memo (Japanese)
 

Year of birth missing (living people)
Living people
Manga writers